Eduard Hulordava (born on 11 December 1989) is a Ukrainian footballer who plays as a defender.

Club history
He has played for "Atlant-Vagonobudivelnik-Kremin" in 2005 and for FC Kremin Kremenchuk in the Druha Liha B franchise since 2006.

External links
Official team website for FC Kremin Kremenchuk
FC Kremin Kremenchuk Squad

1989 births
Living people
FC Kremin Kremenchuk players
Ukrainian footballers
Association football defenders
People from Kremenchuk
Sportspeople from Poltava Oblast
21st-century Ukrainian people